Diala Barakat (ديالا بركات) (born 1980) is a member of the Cabinet of Syria in the Second Hussein Arnous government as Minister of State for Southern Development Affairs.

References

1980 births
Living people
Syrian ministers of state
People of the Syrian civil war
People from Homs Governorate
Syrian Sunni Muslims
Syrian Social Nationalist Party politicians
21st-century Syrian women politicians
21st-century Syrian politicians
Women government ministers of Syria